The Cal 27 is an American sailboat, that was designed by William Lapworth and first built in 1971.

Production
The boat was built by Jensen Marine in the United States, who completed 306 examples between 1971 and 1974. It is now out of production.

The Cal 27 design was replaced in the company line by the Cal 2-27 in 1974.

Design
The Cal 27 is a small recreational keelboat, built predominantly of fiberglass, with wood trim. It has a masthead sloop rig, an internally-mounted spade-type rudder and a fixed fin keel. It displaces  and carries  of ballast.

The boat has a PHRF racing average handicap of 210 with a high of 210 and low of 210.

A version was also built with a  taller mast.

See also
List of sailing boat types

Related development
Cal 2-27
Cal 3-27

Similar sailboats
Aloha 27
C&C 27
Catalina 27
Catalina 270
Catalina 275 Sport
CS 27
Edel 820
Express 27
Fantasia 27
Halman Horizon
Hotfoot 27
Hullmaster 27
Hunter 27
Hunter 27-2
Hunter 27-3
Island Packet 27
Mirage 27 (Perry)
Mirage 27 (Schmidt)
Mirage 275
O'Day 272
Orion 27-2
Watkins 27
Watkins 27P

References

External links

Keelboats
1970s sailboat type designs
Sailing yachts
Sailboat type designs by Bill Lapworth
Sailboat types built by Cal Yachts